Hauxwell's thrush (Turdus hauxwelli) is a species of bird in the family Turdidae. It is found in Bolivia, Brazil, Colombia, Ecuador, Peru, and Venezuela.

Its natural habitats are subtropical or tropical moist lowland forests and subtropical or tropical swamps.

References

Hauxwell's thrush
Birds of the Amazon Basin
Birds of the Colombian Amazon
Birds of the Ecuadorian Amazon
Birds of the Peruvian Amazon
Birds of the Bolivian Amazon
Hauxwell's thrush
Taxonomy articles created by Polbot